The men's 10 km free competition of the 2014 Winter Paralympics was held at Laura Biathlon & Ski Complex near Krasnaya Polyana, Sochi. The competition took place on March 16, 2014.

Medal table

Standing

Sitting

Visually Impaired

See also
Cross-country skiing at the 2014 Winter Olympics

References

Men's 10 km